Mispila venosa is a species of beetle in the family Cerambycidae. It was described by Francis Polkinghorne Pascoe in 1864. It is known from Malaysia, Sulawesi, Borneo, Vietnam, Java and the Andaman Islands.

References

venosa
Beetles described in 1864